Saher is a both a  family name and a unisex given name. This name also means serenity, and grace. Most people comment on the beauty of individuals with this name, but the real capability lies in their intelligence, nobility, and ascendance. Notable people with this name include:

 Charlene von Saher (born 1974), British figure skater
 Habib Saher (1903–1988), Iranian poet
 Saher Thioune (born 1989), Senegalese football player
 Saher Al-Suraihi (born 1998), Saudi Arabian football player
 Saher Galt - musician in duo Galt Aureus